Xaa-Trp aminopeptidase (aminopeptidase W, aminopeptidase X-Trp) is an enzyme. This enzyme catalyses the following chemical reaction

 Release of a variety of N-terminal residues (especially glutamate and leucine) from peptides, provided tryptophan (or at least phenylalanine or tyrosine) is the penultimate residue. Also acts on Glu!Trp, Leu!Trp and a number of other dipeptides

This glycoprotein containins Zn2+.

References

External links 
 

EC 3.4.11